Alan Abela-Wadge (born 15 March 1987) is a Maltese politician who is a councillor on the Msida Local Council. He was elected on behalf of the Nationalist Party. Abel-Wadge is the President of the College of Local Councillors - Nationalist Party (KKLPN) and a member of the Nationalist Party's Executive Committee and Administrative committee.

Education
Abela-Wadge was born in Msida. He received secondary education at San Gorg Preca College (ex Dun Guzepp Zammit (Brighella)) in Ħamrun and higher education at the University of Malta, graduating in business management.

Career
Abela-Wadge started his personal career, after graduating, in operations management for about 12 years. He is currently the Head of Operations of a local company. Abela Wadge was involved in football for 10 years and is now a politician.

Football
Abela Wadge was a committee member with Msida Saint-Joseph F.C. for 10 years. Initially, he joined in the 2004/2005 season, when he held the position of Financial Director (3 years), followed by becoming vice-president (2 years) and as President before resigning.

Politics
Abela Wadge contested the local election in Msida in 2013, as a candidate with the Nationalist Party, and was elected councilor. He was assigned the portfolio of Sports & Youths. In the same year, he was elected as an executive member of the KKLPN. On 15 September 2014, he was accepted by the Nationalist Party to run for the general election, on their behalf. In July 2015 he was elected as the President of the College of Local Councillors.

See also

 List of Maltese people

References

1987 births
Football people in Malta
Living people
Maltese Roman Catholics
Nationalist Party (Malta) politicians
People from Msida
21st-century Maltese politicians